Friedrich Wilhelm of Hohenzollern-Hechingen (20 September 1663 in Hechingen – 14 November 1735 in Hechingen) was the fourth Prince of Hohenzollern-Hechingen and was also an imperial Field Marshal.

Life 
Friedrich Wilhelm was the eldest son of Prince Philipp of Hohenzollern-Hechingen (1616–1671) from his marriage to Marie Sidonie (1635–1686), the daughter of  Margrave Herman Fortunatus of Baden-Rodemachern. He was still a minor when he succeeded his father as Prince, so his mother took up the regency.  Friedrich Wilhelm was sent to Baden, where he was further educated.  He later completed his military training in Vienna.  By the end of 1681, he took up the government of Hohenzollern-Hechingen himself.

In the imperial army, Friedrich Wilhelm was Field Marshal and the owner of a regiment of cuirassiers bearing his name.  In 1682, he participated in the suppression of an uprising in Hungary and in the victory in the Battle of Slankamen.

In 1702, he was taken prisoner in Friedlingen.  However, he managed to free himself.  Two years later, he fought on the victorious side in the battle of Blenheim.  Also in 1704, he fought under Field Marshal Sigbert Heister to suppress another Hungarian uprising.

With permission from the Emperor, Friedrich Wilhelm reached an agreement with the Elector of Brandenburg about the Burgraviate of Nuremberg and became one of the first recipients of the Prussian Order of the Black Eagle.

Marriages and offspring 
Friedrich Wilhelm married twice.  He first married on 22 January 1687 in Vienna to Maria Leopoldina (1666–1709), the daughter of Count Georg Ludwig of Sinzendorf.  With her, he had the following children:
 Friedrich Ludwig (1688–1750), Prince of Hohenzollern-Hechingen
 Ludwige Ernstine Friederike (1690–1720), married in 1713 Prince Franz Anton of Lamberg (1678–1759)
 Charlotte (1692–1692)
 Christine Eberhardine Friederike (1695–1754), abbess of Munsterbilzen Abbey
 Sophie Johanna Frederika (1698–1754), abbess of Munsterbilzen Abbey
 Friedrich Karl (1697–1697)

He married his second wife on 7 September 1710 in Hechingen.  She was Baroness Maximiliane Magdalena of Lützau (1690–1755).  Emperor Karl VI had elevated her to "Countess of Homburg"  and this marriage was not considered morganatic.  This marriage produced two children:
 Herman Eberhard Friedrich (1711–1726), Count of Hohenzollern
 Maria Maximiliana (1713–1743), married in 1741 to Count Innocent Künigl of Ehrenburg (1714–1764)

Ancestry

References 
 E. G. Johler: Geschichte, Land- und Ortskunde der souverainen teutschen Fürstenthümer Hohenzollern, Hechingen und Sigmaringen, 1824, p. 56 ff, Online)
 Gustav Schilling: Geschichte des Hauses Hohenzollern, in genealogisch fortlaufenden Biographien aller seiner Regenten von den ältesten bis auf die neuesten Zeiten, nach Urkunden und andern authentischen Quellen, F. Fleischer, 1843, p. 238 ff

Princes of Hohenzollern-Hechingen
House of Hohenzollern
1663 births
1735 deaths
Field marshals of Germany
Generals of the Holy Roman Empire
Military personnel from Baden-Württemberg
People from Hechingen